João Maria Lobo Alves Palhinha Gonçalves (born 9 July 1995) is a Portuguese professional footballer who plays for  club Fulham and the Portugal national team as a defensive midfielder.

He came through at Sporting CP, first appearing with the first team in 2017 and also having loans at Moreirense, Belenenses and Braga. After returning he became a starter, notably winning the 2020–21 Primeira Liga. In July 2022, he signed with Fulham for £20 million.

Palhinha made his full debut for Portugal in 2021. He was part of the squads at Euro 2020 and the 2022 World Cup.

Club career

Sporting CP
Born in Lisbon, Palhinha joined local Sporting CP's youth system in 2012, aged 17. He played his first game as a professional with the B team, coming on as a late substitute for fellow youth graduate Iuri Medeiros in a 3−2 home win against Portimonense in the Segunda Liga, on 3 February 2014; it was one of only two appearances during the season.

Still in the second division, Palhinha scored his first senior goal on 4 April 2015, his header contributing to a 3−1 home victory over Leixões. From July 2015 to January 2017 he was loaned to Primeira Liga clubs Moreirense and Belenenses, respectively, making his debut in the competition whilst with the former in a 0−2 home loss to Arouca where he played 22 minutes from the bench, and netting for the first time while at the service of the latter against Vitória de Guimarães (1−1 away draw, 90 minutes played).

Subsequently, returning to the Estádio José Alvalade, Palhinha made his competitive debut with the first team on 21 January 2017, starting in a 2−2 draw at Marítimo. He scored his first goals for them on 12 October of the same year, netting twice in a 4–2 away win over Oleiros in the Taça de Portugal.

Palhinha spent the following two seasons on loan to Braga. He appeared in 76 competitive matches during his spell, helping to a third-place finish in 2019–20 and notably scoring the game's only goal against Benfica for the club's first win at that opposition in 65 years.

Having started the 2020–21 campaign training on his own in the midst of negotiations with Al Nassr and CSKA Moscow, Palhinha was eventually reintegrated into Sporting's main squad and ended up contributing 32 appearances for the champions, with a goal in the 2–0 home defeat of Paços de Ferreira; consequently, he was named in the Primeira Liga Team of the Year alongside five of his teammates.

In 2021–22, still under manager Rúben Amorim, Palhinha began facing stiff competition from newly-signed Manuel Ugarte. He played 95 official games during his spell, scoring seven times.

Fulham
On 4 July 2022, Palhinha signed a five-year contract with Fulham for £20 million. He made his Premier League debut on 6 August, playing the entire 2–2 home draw against Liverpool. He scored his first goal 14 days later, helping the hosts to beat Brentford 3–2.

International career
Palhinha represented Portugal at under-18, under-19 and under-20 levels. In March 2021 he was called up to the full side for the first time, for 2022 FIFA World Cup qualifiers against Azerbaijan, Luxembourg and Serbia. He won his first cap in the match with the first adversary, replacing Rúben Neves late into the 1–0 victory in Turin. He scored his first goal in the same phase, closing the 3–1 away win over Luxembourg.

Being selected for UEFA Euro 2020, Palhinha appeared against France in the group stage (2–2) and Belgium in the round of 16 (1–0 loss). In November 2022, he was named in the final squad for the World Cup finals in Qatar.

Career statistics

Club

International

 Portugal score listed first, score column indicates score after each Palhinha goal.

Honours
Braga
Taça da Liga: 2019–20

Sporting CP
Primeira Liga: 2020–21
Taça da Liga: 2020–21, 2021–22
Supertaça Cândido de Oliveira: 2021

Individual
Primeira Liga Team of the Year: 2020–21

References

External links

Portuguese League profile 

1995 births
Living people
Portuguese footballers
Footballers from Lisbon
Association football midfielders
Primeira Liga players
Liga Portugal 2 players
Sporting CP B players
Sporting CP footballers
Moreirense F.C. players
C.F. Os Belenenses players
S.C. Braga players
Premier League players
Fulham F.C. players
Portugal youth international footballers
Portugal international footballers
UEFA Euro 2020 players
2022 FIFA World Cup players
Portuguese expatriate footballers
Expatriate footballers in England
Portuguese expatriate sportspeople in England